Maria Laura Devetach (born 5 October 1936) is an Argentinian writer for children.

Life
Devetach was born in Reconquista, Santa Fe in 1936 to a Slavic father and an Argentine mother who was very skilled with textiles. She has worked as an educator of both children and adults. Devetach has published more than ninety books and many of these are for children. She was married to Gustavo Roldán who died in 2012 and they had two children. One of these children is a cartoonist named for his father. He has illustrated some of his mother's books.

References

1936 births
Living people
People from Reconquista, Santa Fe
Argentine children's writers
Argentine women children's writers
Argentine essayists
Argentine women short story writers